Paul Williams (born January 29, 1947) was a football player in the Canadian Football League for eight years. Williams played defensive back for the Winnipeg Blue Bombers and Saskatchewan Roughriders from 1971 to 1978. He was a CFL All-Star in 1976.

He played college football at the University of California at Berkeley.

References

1947 births
Living people
American players of Canadian football
California Golden Bears football players
Canadian football defensive backs
Saskatchewan Roughriders players
Winnipeg Blue Bombers players